Gokarna Bista is a Nepalese politician and was Secretary of Communist Party of Nepal (UML). He served as Ministry of Energy under the prime minister Jhala Nath Khanal and is former Minister of Labour, Employment and Social Security under KP Oli led cabinet. He was elected in the 2013 Nepalese Constituent Assembly election from Gulmi district constituency number 3. In April 2011, during his tenure as Ministry of Energy, he was stabbed by two motorcyclists. He became popular for revolutionary changes in power sector of Nepal.

Early life and career 

A central member of, Gokarna Raj Bista was born on July 1, 1965, in Dohali-3, Gulmi District. Son of Bhim Bahadur and Chinta Kala Bista, he commenced his political career in 1978.

Succeeded to take out his name in Public Service Commission in 1983, he quit the government job immediately as disputes erupted with Kaji Man Kandnawa, Anchaladish(zone chief), on the very first day of his job. Then onwards, he joined politics and took membership of the party in 1986.

Bista served as a Bagmati zone chairman and a Kathmandu district chairman of ANNFSU, students’ wing of CPN-UML. He took assignment as a Chief to different departments such as Organization committee of Central Committee, Education Department, Creative Department, Publicity and Promotion Department.

After involving with students’ politics, he joined the working committee of then Democratic National Youth Association DNYA (Now Youth Association of Nepal) in 1993. He became the chairman of DNYA for two terms starting from 2000 after being General Secretary in 1996.

Bista, who served as an in-charge to different departments like Local Department, Students’ Department and Youth Department, is currently serving as an in-charge to Intellectual Council of CPN-UML.

A parliamentarian of 1996 parliament, elected from Gulmi-3, Bista was appointed as a Minister for Energy during Jhala Nath Khanal led government. In 2008 CA election, he was defeated by then CPN-Maoist's candidate from same constituency, Gulmi-3.

A locally popular leader Bista became quite popular for his attempts to implement the revolutionary changes in country's power sector including power cuts. He holds master's degree in Management Faculty and bachelor's degree in law.

Family 
He was born on 1 July 1965 at Gulmi district to Bhim Bahadur Bista and Chinta Kala Bista.

Electoral history 

1999 House of Representatives Election Gulmi-3

2008 Constituent Assembly Election Gulmi-3

2013 Constituent Assembly Election Gulmi-3

2017 House of Representatives Election Gulmi-2

2022 House of Representatives Election Gulmi-2

References 

Living people
1965 births
People from Gulmi District
Communist Party of Nepal (Unified Marxist–Leninist) politicians
Government ministers of Nepal
Nepal MPs 2017–2022
Nepal Communist Party (NCP) politicians
Tribhuvan University alumni

Members of the 2nd Nepalese Constituent Assembly
Nepal MPs 1999–2002
Nepal MPs 2022–present